Woo Ji-hyun is a South Korean actor. He is known for his roles in dramas such as The Veil, Mouse, A Piece of Your Mind and All of Us Are Dead. He also appeared in movies In Between Seasons, The Witness, I Can Speak and Kim Ji-young: Born 1982.

Filmography

Film

Television series

Web series

Music video appearances

Hosting

Awards and nominations

References

External links 
 
 

1986 births
Living people
21st-century South Korean male actors
South Korean male television actors
South Korean male film actors